The Michael Byrne Cup is an association football cup competition featuring teams from the Galway & District League. It is now the main league cup competition for this league. However when it was originally inaugurated in 1976–77, it was a play-off featuring the top teams from the four junior leagues affiliated to the Connacht Football Association. These are the Galway & District League, the Sligo-Leitrim League, the Mayo Association Football League and the Roscommon & District League. The winners were recognised as the Connacht junior champions and the cup was also referred to as the Connacht Champions Cup.

List of winners

Notes

References

Association football cup competitions in Connacht
Galway & District League
1976 establishments in Ireland